Cry Tuff Dub Encounter Chapter 3 is a 1980 reggae album by Prince Far I & the Arabs. The album was originally released on vinyl in 1980 on the London-based Daddy Kool label, and was reissued on compact disc in 1996 by Pressure Sounds.

Track listing
All tracks by Prince Far I

"Plant Up" – 8:09
"Back Weh" – 4:32
"The Conquest" – 4:04
"Final Chapter" – 3:42
"Shake the Nation" – 4:16
"Homeward Bound" – 7:45
"Low Gravity" – 4:23
"Mansion of Invention" – 2:49

Personnel 

Steve Barker – liner notes
Steve Beresford – synthesizer, human whistle, melodica
Bingy Bunny – rhythm guitar
Errol "Flabba" Holt – bass guitar
Beth Lesser – photography
Kevin Metcalfe – mastering
Jeb Loy Nichols – prints
Prince Far I – percussion, producer
Lincoln "Style" Scott – percussion, drums
Noel "Sowell" Bailey – guitar
David Toop – flute
Ari Up – backing vocals 
Kishi Yamamoto – photography

References

Prince Far I albums
1980 albums
Dub albums